Monteirópolis is a municipality located in the Brazilian state of Alagoas. Its population is 7,165 (2020) and its area is 86 km².

References

Municipalities in Alagoas